Together was an album released by trance musician Ferry Corsten. He released it under the alias System F in 2003.

Track listing
 Together (3:23)
 The Sonnet (3:59)
 Ligaya (as Gouryella) (3:28)
 Ignition, Sequence, Start! (3:31)
 Dance Valley Theme 2001 (3:43)
 Deja Vu (3:55)
 Spaceman (2:21)
 Savannah (3:45)
 Pegasus (3:19)
 Reaching Your Soul (4:36)
 Devotion (4:21)
 Underwater (4:07)
 Solarize (4:51)
 Q-Rious (3:45)
 Spread Your Wings (3:54)

2003 albums
Ferry Corsten albums